Nicolas Simon Bedos (born 21 April 1979) is a French comedian, writer, director and actor. The son of Guy Bedos, he became known in 2004 as a playwright. In 2013, he joined Laurent Ruquier's late-night On n'est pas couché television talk show as a satirist, which he left two years later. His first film, Mr. & Mrs. Adelman, premiered in 2017.

Filmography

As actor

As filmmaker

Theatre

Columnist

Publication

Television

Radio

References

External links

 

1980 births
Living people
People from Neuilly-sur-Seine
French comedians
French theatre directors
French television personalities
21st-century French male actors
French male film actors
French film directors
French screenwriters
French male television actors
Elle (magazine) writers